Chumbi may refer to:

Chumbi Valley, Tibet
 Chumbi, a town in the Chumbi Valley
 Chumbi language, also called "Groma language", spoken in the Chumbi Valley
 Chumbi wall, a species of butterfly
Chumbi (footballer), Spanish footballer

See also
Chumbi Surla Wildlife Sanctuary